Lycée et collège Hélène Boucher is a senior high school and junior high school on Cours de Vincennes in the 20th arrondissement of Paris.

Lycée de Jeunes Filles du Cours de Vincennes, a school for girls, was constructed on a site which previously held a gas factory. It was built in 1935 and established by decree on October 3, 1937. It did not close during World War II, and was renamed after Boucher. The enrollment had a significant increase in the 1950s. Enrollment became stable after Lycée Maurice Ravel, which originated from the annexe des Maraîchers, opened. Lycée Boucher was affected by the May 1968 events in France.

References

External links

 Lycée Hélène Boucher 

Lycées in Paris
20th arrondissement of Paris
Art Deco architecture in France
School buildings completed in 1935